Mark Majerczak (born 20 April 1968) is a former Australian rules footballer who played with Carlton in the Australian Football League (AFL).

Notes

External links

Mark Majerczak's profile at Blueseum

1968 births
Carlton Football Club players
Living people
Australian rules footballers from Victoria (Australia)